The 1983 I ACB International Tournament was the 1st semi-official edition of the European Basketball Club Super Cup. It took place at Palau dels Esports de Barcelona, Barcelona, Spain, on 2, 3 and 4 September 1983 with the participations of FC Barcelona (champions of the 1982–83 Liga Española de Baloncesto and the 1983 Copa del Rey de Baloncesto), Real Madrid (runners-up of the 1982–83 Liga Española de Baloncesto), Banco di Roma (champions of the 1982–83 FIP Serie A1) and Bosna (champions of the 1982–83 First Federal Basketball League).

League stage
Day 1, September 2, 1983

|}

Day 2, September 3, 1983

|}

Day 3, September 4, 1983

|}

Final standings 

European Basketball Club Super Cup
1983–84 in European basketball
1983–84 in Spanish basketball
1983–84 in Italian basketball
1983–84 in Yugoslav basketball
International basketball competitions hosted by Spain
International basketball competitions hosted by Catalonia